Amadeus Wallschläger (born 1 September 1985) is a German former professional footballer who played as a defender.

Career
Born in Eisenhüttenstadt, Wallschläger played for SG Aufbau Eisenhüttenstadt, Eisenhüttenstädter FC Stahl, Viktoria Frankfurt/Oder, Hertha BSC, Hertha BSC II, FC Carl Zeiss Jena, FC Carl Zeiss Jena II, Berliner FC Dynamo and FSV Union Fürstenwalde.

References

1985 births
Living people
Sportspeople from Eisenhüttenstadt
German footballers
Eisenhüttenstädter FC Stahl players
1. FC Frankfurt players
Hertha BSC players
Hertha BSC II players
FC Carl Zeiss Jena players
Berliner FC Dynamo players
FSV Union Fürstenwalde players
Bundesliga players
3. Liga players
Association football defenders
Footballers from Brandenburg